Ravee Farooq is a Maldivian actor, director, editor and choreographer.

Career
Farooq made his film debut with Abdul Faththaah-directed romantic disaster film, Hureemey Inthizaarugaa (2005) cast along with Mariyam Zuhura, Waleedha Waleed, Ibrahim Jihad and Neena Saleem. The film, heavily relied on the effect of the 2004 Indian Ocean earthquake on the Maldives, received favorable reviews from critics though it failed to perform financially. Farooq played the disrespectful husband who chose wealth above his family. His performance won a Miadhu Crystal Award for the Best Male Newcomer.

In April 2006, Ahmed Nimal's revenge thriller Hiyani was released which featured Farooq as the kidnapper who constantly flirts with a rich married woman. The film which primarily focuses on a wealthy troublesome couple whose possessions have been exposed by the disappearance of the husband, was mostly received positively by the critics. At 5th Gaumee Film Awards, Farooq was nominated as the Best Actor and Choreographer for his work in the film while he was bestowed with the Best Choreography award for the song "Asthaa Asthaa" at 1st Miadhu Crystal Awards.

In 2008, Farooq appeared as the cunning brother-in-law in Fathimath Nahula's romantic drama film, Yoosuf which depicts the story of a deaf and mute man (played by Yoosuf Shafeeu) who has been mistreated by a wealthy family, mocking his disability. Featuring an ensemble cast including Yoosuf Shafeeu, Niuma Mohamed, Sheela Najeeb, Ahmed Nimal, Mohamed Manik, Fauziyya Hassan, Zeenath Abbas and Ahmed Lais Asim, the film is considered to include most prominent faces in a Maldivian film. The film received widespread critical acclaim and was attained a blockbuster status at box office. A total of forty five housefull shows were screened at Olympus Cinema before the film was leaked online, however the producers were able to screen five more shows at the cinema making it one of the Maldivian all-time highest grossing movies. The film was Maldivian official entry at 2009 SAARC Film Festivals and holds the privilege of being the opening movie of the festival.

Farooq's first release of 2010 was Ali Shifau-directed family drama Dhin Veynuge Hithaamaigaa where he played the role of Jana, a photographer who gave a breakthrough to Nisha, played by Niuma Mohamed. The film showcases discrimination against the islanders, family revenge and fatherhood responsibilities. The film and his performance received positive response from critics. The film was believed to be a "huge improvement" over the recent Maldivian films. Being able to screen fifteen housefull shows of the film, it was declared to be a commercial success. He reunited with Niuma Mohamed and Ali Seezan in Amjad Ibrahim's romantic horror film Vakinuvinama which was a critical and commercial failure.

The following year, he played the role of Imran, a spoiled kid who is envious of his step-mother, in Moomin Fuad-directed crime tragedy drama Loodhifa (2011). Featuring an ensemble cast, the film deals with current social issues in the society told from different perspectives of the characters. Made on a budget of MVR 600,000, the film was declared a commercial failure though it received wide critical acclaim, praising the performance of cast and the film's "realism" in its language, characters and their attitude. His portrayal garnered him a Gaumee Film Award for Best Supporting Actor.

Farooq was more involved in film direction for the next two years. In 2012, he directed Fathimath Nahula produced romantic drama Mihashin Furaana Dhandhen which features Niuma Mohamed, Mohamed Manik and Ali Seezan in pivotal roles. In an interview he mentioned that the film primarily based on a dramatic theme and he considered his experience to be "merely satisfying" while it is different than his previous directorial ventures. Upon release, the film received mixed response from critics while his work was recognised positively. Ahmed Nadheem of Haveeru noted the film as "the best Maldivian melodramatic film" he had seen in the past two years, though displeased with its similarities between two Bollywood films. In 2013, Farooq directed critically acclaimed experimental suspense thriller Ingili which features Ismail Rasheed and Abdulla Muaz. It was based on fourteen years old Mohamed Hassaan's National Award winning short story, Holhuasheege Ekuveriya. It celebrates the first Maldivian film to get recognized internationally by winning Bronze Medal in Best Feature Film category at SAARC Film Festival 2014 held in Colombo, Sri Lanka. At the 7th Gaumee Film Awards, Farooq received several nominations for his work in the film, including Best Director, Best Editing, Best Art Direction, Best Costume Design and Best Makeup. At 3rd Maldives Film Awards, Farooq received two nominations for Best Director, from Ingili and Mihashin Furaana Dhandhen, while winning the award for latter.

In 2014, Farooq appeared as a doctor in the Ali Aishath Fuwad Thowfeek-directed Hulhudhaan  alongside Mariyam Majudha and Roanu Hassan Manik which garnered critical success.  The film was later screened at the Venice Film Festival. The following year, Farooq directed the suspense thriller film Mikoe Bappa Baey Baey which stars Mohamed Manik and Aishath Rishmy in pivotal roles. The film along with his direction was critically acclaimed. It was one of the three entries from the Maldives at the SAARC Film Festival in 2016. At the 8th Gaumee Film Awards Farooq received five nominations, including a Best Supporting Actor and Best Editing award nomination for Hulhudhaan and a Best Director, Best Art Direction and Best Editing award nomination for Mikoe Bappa Baey Baey.

In 2017, Farooq portrayed Ishan, a criminal who sought guidance from Vishka, played by Aishath Rishmy, in his crime thriller Vishka; it marked his second collaboration with Rishmy. Prior to release, it faced controversies as Hassan Haleel requested a deferment in its release claiming he allegedly owns the story and script of the film. However, the film was cleared for exhibition with the court order proclaiming that the ownership of the script and story belongs to Rishmy. Upon release, the film opened to a positive response from critics. Mohamed Musthafa of the Sun applauded its "unexpected climax" and Ravi's "exceptional work" in acting, directing and editing. Echoing similar sentiments, Ahmed Nadheem of Avas opined his acting to be "per excellence, and beyond Maldivian cinematic standards". The film was screened at the SAARC Film Festival in 2017.

2018 was a dull year for Maldivian film-industry with regard to 2018 Maldivian presidential election. Farooq's only release of the year was the first Maldivian web-series, a romantic drama by Fathimath Nahula, Huvaa. The series consisting of sixty episodes and streamed through the digital platform Baiskoafu, centers around a happy and radiant family which breaks into despairing pieces after a tragic incident that led to an unaccountable loss. The series and his performance as a young man trying to win the love of a divorcee were positively received.

Later during the year, first Maldivian anthology film was released which credited Farooq as the director of the segment titled Gaathil which revolves around murder of a premature baby and a grown-up man. The project was filmed in 2013 and digitally released six years later due to several delays in post-production, where the producer of the film criticizes Farooq for "failing" to complete his segment during the stipulated time period took over the project from Farooq which he considered as an act of a "personal vendetta" against him.

Media image
In 2018, he was ranked in the sixth position from Dho?'s list of Top Ten Actor of Maldives.

Personal life
Farooq first married Lahfa Faiz, a vocalist and the couple got divorced after few years. He later married to Fathimath Riva Hussain and was blessed with two boys. On 8 January 2009, his wife gave birth to their first son, Hussain Ruvau Ravee and on 11 April 2013, she gave birth to their second child, Ali Ravaih Ravee before the couple got divorced few months later. He then started a relationship with Aishath Rishmy. On 25 March 2019, Farooq and Rishmy married without publicity. On 9 February 2022, Rameez announced their divorce through her social media account.

Filmography

Feature film

Television

Short film

Other work

Discography

Accolades

References 

Living people
People from Malé
21st-century Maldivian male actors
Maldivian male film actors
Maldivian film directors
1982 births